The Sergant A was a French 4-cylinder, air-cooled, upright inline piston engine with a maximum output of , designed to meet the needs of the very small and light single seat sports aircraft of the early 1920s. It was used by at least ten different types.

Design and development
In both the UK and France in the early 1920s there was a wish to make civilian flying more affordable, both in capital outlay and in running costs.  This led to a need for low power engines. In Britain there were suitable engines like the Bristol Cherub but French designers were largely forced to import engines, either from the UK or Italy. The Sergant A was intended to provide a native product.

It was on display at the November 1923 Paris Salon and struck Flight's reporter as "extremely interesting" and car-engine like in its four cylinder inline arrangement, a little heavy but reliable.  It was unusual in its high maximum crankshaft speed of 3,200 rpm and the availability of a choice of reduction gear ratios.

Operational history
The date of first running is not known but it appeared, and was widely used by a variety of aircraft and in several contests during 1923, with more in 1924.

Applications
Breguet Colibri
Carley C.12
Carmier-Simplex 10 hp
Farman Moustique
Gambier-SABCA
Peyret Avionette
Peyret-le Prieur Hydroplan
Poncelet Castar
Poncelet Vivette
SABCA-Jullien SJ-1A

Specifications

References

External links
Poncelet Vivette with photos and text on Sergant A

1920s aircraft piston engines